The Chicago, Milwaukee, St. Paul and Pacific Railroad Depot in Aberdeen, South Dakota was built by the Chicago, Milwaukee, St. Paul and Pacific Railroad (also known as The Milwaukee Road) in 1911.

The depot is rectangular in shape, two stories, and is built of brick and concrete. Its style reflects the Craftsman/Prairie influences of the early 20th century. It was built to replace an earlier wooden depot that burned. Aberdeen served as a division point on the Milwaukee Road and the upper floors of the depot contained railroad offices. In its heyday the station served the Milwaukee Road's Olympian Hiawatha, which ran from Chicago to Seattle and Tacoma. Passenger trains last served the station for Minneapolis in April 1969.

The depot is the largest brick passenger depot still standing in South Dakota. It was listed in the National Register due to its architecture and association with the development of railroads in South Dakota.

The building was bought by an investment company that leases office space. The basement of the depot houses a model railroad club.

References
 French, Edith. Chicago, Milwaukee, St. Paul and Pacific Railroad Depot (Brown County, South Dakota) National Register of Historic Places Inventory-Nomination Form, 1977. On file at the National Park Service.

Railway stations on the National Register of Historic Places in South Dakota
Railway stations in the United States opened in 1911
Aberdeen, South Dakota
Buildings and structures in Aberdeen, South Dakota
1911 establishments in South Dakota
National Register of Historic Places in Brown County, South Dakota
Railway stations closed in 1969
Former railway stations in South Dakota